Robert Murray (born October 17, 1951) is a Canadian-born German former professional ice hockey defenceman.

Career
Born in Calgary, Alberta, Canada, Murray played Canadian college hockey with the Mount Royal College cougars. He went on to play 10 seasons of professional hockey in Germany.

Murray competed as a member of the West Germany national ice hockey team at the 1978, 1979, and 1981 World Ice Hockey Championships.

References

External links

1951 births
Living people
Adler Mannheim players
Canadian ice hockey defencemen
Düsseldorfer EG players
EV Landshut players
German ice hockey players
Rapid City Rush players
SC Riessersee players
Ice hockey people from Calgary
Canadian expatriate ice hockey players in Germany